Garden City, sometimes known as Garden City Beach, is a census-designated place (CDP) in Horry County, South Carolina, United States. The population was 9,209 at the 2010 census. Garden City Beach is located directly south of Surfside Beach. The developed part of the beach extends south beyond the limits of the Garden City CDP, into Georgetown County, and ends on a peninsula at the mouth of Murrells Inlet.

Geography
Garden City is located in southern Horry County at  (33.587760, -79.005221). It is bordered to the northeast by the town of Surfside Beach, to the northwest by U.S. Route 17, to the south by the Georgetown County/Horry County line, and to the southeast by the Atlantic Ocean. U.S. Route 17 Business is the main road through the center of the community, leading northeast  to the center of Myrtle Beach.

Demographics

2020 census

As of the 2020 United States census, there were 10,235 people, 4,893 households, and 2,765 families residing in the CDP.

2000 census
As of the census of 2000, there were 9,357 people, 4,703 households, and 2,873 families residing in the CDP.  The population density was 1,745.1 people per square mile (674.0/km2). There were 7,995 housing units at an average density of 1,491.1/sq mi (575.9/km2). The racial makeup of the CDP was 97.02% White, 1.00% African American, 0.28% Native American, 0.42% Asian, 0.10% Pacific Islander, 0.30% from other races, and 0.89% from two or more races. Hispanic or Latino of any race were 1.12% of the population.

There were 4,703 households, out of which 12.8% had children under the age of 18 living with them, 52.2% were married couples living together, 6.9% had a female householder with no husband present, and 38.9% were non-families. 31.9% of all households were made up of individuals, and 15.4% had someone living alone who was 65 years of age or older.  The average household size was 1.96 and the average family size was 2.40.

In the CDP, the population was spread out, with 11.2% under the age of 18, 5.6% from 18 to 24, 21.5% from 25 to 44, 27.6% from 45 to 64, and 34.2% who were 65 years of age or older. The median age was 54 years.  For every 100 females, there were 91.5 males.  For every 100 females age 18 and over, there were 89.1 males.

The median income for a household in the CDP was $34,967, and the median income for a family was $40,403. Males had a median income of $27,683 versus $22,904 for females.  The per capita income for the CDP was $24,062.  About 2.9% of families and 5.5% of the population were below the poverty line, including 7.4% of those under age 18 and 3.5% of those age 65 or over.

Attractions

The Pier at Garden City 

Garden City Golf Cart Parade
The Garden City Golf Cart Parade is a Fourth of July parade that features red, white and blue-decorated golf carts. It has been a community tradition for almost 30 years. It originally started at Calhoun Drive behind Willards Fireworks. After a brief hiatus, it was held again on July 4, 2009.

Weather 
Temperatures tend to be in the 80s (°F) during the summer months in Garden City, SC, and in the 40s during the winter. The annual average precipitation at Garden City is 54.57 inches. Rainfall is fairly evenly distributed throughout the year. The wettest month of the year is September with an average rainfall of 6.44 inches.

Hurricane Hazel
The worst disaster in the community's history occurred on 14 October 1954. Hurricane Hazel slammed into the community and left only two houses habitable.

Hurricane Hugo 
In September 1989, Hurricane Hugo destroyed 43% of the beachfront structures along the coast in Garden City. In the aftermath of the storm, Horry County administrator M. L. Love said, "Garden City for all practical purposes is gone." The Kingfisher Pier, as it was known at that time, was also destroyed by Hurricane Hugo. Reconstruction of the pier began in February 1992. The Pier at Garden City, as it is known today, was fully operational July 1992, and no significant damage has been reported since then.

Transportation

Roads and highways
 U.S. 17 Business
 U.S. 17

Mass transit
 The Coast RTA - Bus system operating seven days a week, 364 days a year. 15 routes throughout the Horry County/Grand Strand area, including Myrtle Beach, North Myrtle Beach, Surfside Beach, Garden City, Conway, Loris, and Aynor.

References

External links

 The Pier at Garden City 
 Memories of Maze Mania

Census-designated places in Horry County, South Carolina
Census-designated places in South Carolina
Populated coastal places in South Carolina